2008–09 Eurocup Basketball was the seventh edition of Europe's second-tier level transnational competition for men's professional basketball clubs, the EuroCup, and the first to be contested under the Eurocup name. From the inception of the competition in 2002, it had been known as the ULEB Cup. The EuroCup is the European-wide league level that is one tier below the EuroLeague level.
 
During this season, there were 48 teams, from 22 countries. After the preliminary rounds, there were 32 teams left for the regular season, with the 16 eliminated teams being relegated down and parachuting into Europe's third-tier transnational competition, the EuroChallenge. Lithuanian club Lietuvos Rytas of Vilnius, won the tournament and promotion to the top level EuroLeague for the next season.

Teams of the 2008–2009 Eurocup

Format 
The competition format was also revamped. A total of 48 clubs participated, down from 54 in the previous year's competition. The competition was jointly organized by Euroleague Basketball Company and FIBA Europe.

First preliminary round 

Sixteen teams competed in the first preliminary round, which was organised by FIBA Europe. These teams were paired in two-legged matches, with winners decided on aggregate score. The eight winners advanced to the second preliminary round, and the eight losers parachuted into the third-tier European competition, the EuroChallenge. The matches were played from October 14 through October 21.

Due to a decision of the Italian Basketball Federation to revoke Capo d'Orlando's first division license, followed by an Italian National Olympic Committee (CONI) tribunal rejected appeal by the club, Capo d'Orlando lost the right to participate in European competitions. As a result, Benetton Treviso automatically qualified to the group stage, while Benetton Fribourg advanced to the second qualification round where they met Kalise Gran Canaria.

Second preliminary round 

The second preliminary round, also organised by FIBA Europe, also featured 16 teams, with the eight winners from the first preliminary round joined by eight automatic qualifiers to that phase. As in the first preliminary round, matches were two-legged and decided on aggregate score, with the winners advancing to the Eurocup regular season and the losers parachuting into the EuroChallenge. Matches were played from November 4 to November 11.

Regular season 

Thirty-two teams—24 automatic qualifiers and the eight survivors of the second preliminary round—entered the Regular Season. From this point onward, the competition is organised by Euroleague Basketball Company. The teams were divided into eight groups of four teams each, with each group playing a double round-robin schedule. The first and second-place teams in each group advanced to the Last 16. Regular Season matches were held from November 25, 2008 until January 13, 2009.

Last 16 

For the first time in the history of the competition, a second group phase was played. The survivors of the Regular Season were divided into four-team groups, each playing a double round-robin schedule. This phase has a direct analogue in the top-tier EuroLeague, which conducts an identical group phase, the Top 16, at the same stage of the competition. As in the EuroLeague Top 16, the first- and second-place teams in each group advance to the next phase. However, unlike the EuroLeague, which conducts a separate quarterfinal round before its Final Four, the Eurocup sent its surviving teams into a single knockout tournament, the Final Eight. Last 16 matches were played from January 27 to March 10, 2009.

Final eight 

Like the Euroleague Final Four, this was a knockout tournament, conducted in one-off matches, held at a single site. The semifinal losers played a single match for third place, and the semifinal winners played a single match for the Eurocup title and an automatic place in the 2009-10 Euroleague. This phase was carried over from the prior ULEB Cup format. Matches were played from April 9 through April 12.

This was the last season for the Final Eight format. From 2009–10 onward, a quarterfinal round has been introduced, consisting of two-legged ties between a group winner and the runner-up from a separate group, with the winner of each tie determined on aggregate score. The quarterfinal winners will advance to the Eurocup Finals, with one-off semifinals followed by a one-off final.

Preliminary rounds 
Sixteen teams participated in the first preliminary round, and after the first preliminary round matches, sixteen teams played in a second preliminary round, with the top eight teams from the first preliminary round. Teams that were eliminated from the first or second preliminary round games competed in the EuroChallenge 2008-09.

First preliminary round 

|}

Second preliminary round 

|}

Regular season

Group A

Group B

Group C

Group D

Top 16 
The second grand stage begins from January 27, 2009.

Final eight 
The Final Eight was the last stage of EuroCup 2008-09.

Quarter finals 
April 2, Pala Alpitour, Turin

|}

April 3, Pala Alpitour, Turin

|}

Semi finals 
April 4, Pala Alpitour, Turin

|}

Final 
April 13, Pala Alpitour, Turin

|}

Individual statistics

Points

Rebounds

Assists

Awards

Eurocup 2008–09 MVP 

  Chuck Eidson (  Lietuvos rytas )

Eurocup 2008–09 Finals MVP 

  Marijonas Petravičius (  Lietuvos rytas )

All-Eurocup team

Rising Star 

  Milan Mačvan (  Hemofarm )

Coach of the Year 

  Oktay Mahmuti (  Benetton Treviso )

See also 
 2008–09 Euroleague
 EuroChallenge 2008–09

Notes and references

External links 
 EuroCup Official Website
 European Basketball Website

 
Uleb
2008-09